Pietro Bonato (1765–1820) was an Italian painter and engraver of the Baroque. He was born at Bassano and was a pupil of Giovanni Volpato. He engraved plates after Guido Reni and Correggio.

He worked with Giuseppe Bortignoni the Younger in engraving ceiling decorations from the Vatican.

References

1765 births
1820 deaths
People from Bassano del Grappa
18th-century Italian painters
Italian male painters
19th-century Italian painters
Italian engravers
19th-century Italian male artists
18th-century Italian male artists